Olive Sturgess (born October 8, 1933) is a Canadian former actress who worked in films, television shows, and theatre in the 1950s and 1960s. Her parents were Mr. and Mrs. Leonard Sturgess. Leonard hosted his own radio show. She came to Hollywood in 1954.

Film
Sturgess was signed to Universal Studios in her early 20s. She had a supporting role the comedy film The Kettles in the Ozarks (1956), which was the ninth installment of Universal Pictures's Ma and Pa Kettle series. She played Ma's daughter Nancy Kettle. In Roger Corman's comedy horror film The Raven (1963) starring Vincent Price, Peter Lorre and Boris Karloff, she played Estelle Craven. She appeared as Bonnie Young in the Western film Requiem for a Gunfighter (1965) starring Rod Cameron.

Television
Sturgess appeared in dozens of television series from 1955 to 1974, beginning with an episode of the anthology series Studio 57 titled "Take My Hand."  Other series include The Millionaire (1955),  The People's Choice with Jackie Cooper, Front Row Center, The Red Skelton Hour, Tales of Wells Fargo with Dale Robertson, Sugarfoot with Will Hutchins, Rawhide, Have Gun - Will Travel, Wagon Train, Hawaiian Eye, Maverick with Roger Moore, Checkmate with Sebastian Cabot and Doug McClure,  Petticoat Junction with Edgar Buchanan, The Virginian, Bonanza, The Girl from U.N.C.L.E. and Ironside with Raymond Burr. She also appeared in episodes of The Tall Man starring Clu Gulager with Judy Nugent as one of Andy Clyde's nefarious daughters.

Personal life
Sturgess' cousin was English actress Joan Benham. Sturgess was married to musician Dale Anderson.

References

External links

1933 births
Living people
Canadian film actresses
Canadian television actresses